The 1985 British Open (also known as the 1985 Dulux British Open due to sponsorship) was a professional ranking snooker tournament, that was held from 17 February to 3 March 1985 with television coverage on ITV beginning on 22 February from the Assembly Rooms in Derby, England. It was the first edition of the British Open, having been rebranded from the International Open the previous year. It was the fifth ranking event of the 1984–85 snooker season, preceding the 1985 World Snooker Championship.

In the best-of-23- final, South African player Silvino Francisco defeated Canadian Kirk Stevens 12–9. It was the first major professional snooker tournament without a British player in the final. The event featured a total prize fund of £250,000 with the winner receiving £50,000. The highest  of the event was made by Alex Higgins, who compiled a 142 in his last-16 match against Cliff Thorburn.

Overview
The 1985 British Open was held between 17 February and 3 March 1985. The qualifying competition took place across venues in London, Bristol and Stockport. The first round took place at the Connaught Club in London and the Bradbury Hall in Chesterfield between 14 and 17 January 1985, whilst the remaining rounds took place at the Assembly Rooms, Derby. The qualifying and first rounds were played as best-of-11 . The following rounds, from last 32 to quarter-finals, were played as shorter best-of-9-frames matches because of television scheduling. Broadcaster ITV were concerned about the prospect of large overtime payments for their staff if matches overran, and also requested that the afternoon matches started at 2:00 pm rather than the originally scheduled 1:00 pm, to avoid higher payments to lighting technicians that would have been due if the lighting was switched on before that time. The decision by snooker governing body the World Professional Billiards and Snooker Association (WPBSA) to cut the length of matches in response to ITV's request was publicly criticised by WPBSA board member Barry Hearn, who was also the manager of prominent player Steve Davis.

The event was sponsored by ICI Paints Division and was known for sponsorship purposes as the 1985 Dulux British Open. It took the place of the non-ranking 1984 International Masters tournament on the professional snooker calendar.

Prize fund
The prize fund for the event was £250,000, with the winner receiving £50,000.

 Winner: £50,000
 Runner-up: £30,000
 Semi-finals: £17,500
 Quarter-finals: £9,000
 Last 16: £4,625
 Last 32: £2,000
 Last 64: £750
 Highest break (televised stages): £5,000 Alex Higgins (142)
 Highest break (pre-televised stages): £5,000 Steve Davis (129)
 Total: £250,000

Tournament summary
In the first round, Bill Werbeniuk, 14th in the world rankings, was beaten 1–6 by Bob Chaperon. Malcolm Bradley, in his first season as a professional player, beat David Taylor 6–3. Bob Harris, who to that point had made little impact as a player, beat world number six Eddie Charlton 6–3 after being 1–3 behind. Jimmy White was 3–1 ahead of Tony Jones but the match went to the deciding frame before White won, 6–5. Another first-year professional, Danny Fowler, beat Rex Williams, the former world billiards champion, 6–3. A third new professional, Tony Chappel, led reigning world champion Steve Davis 5–4, before Davis prevailed 6–5.

The television stages of the event began in the second round. Steve Newbury, in his first season as a professional player, recorded a 5–3 win over former world champion Terry Griffiths in the last 32. Other players unexpectedly losing in the second round were Willie Thorne, who lost 0–5 to Murdo MacLeod; Ray Reardon, who was wearing spectacles for the first time in a match and who was beaten 4–5 by Dave Martin after leading 4–1; and Jimmy White, who lost 4–5 to Silvino Francisco. Only seven of the top sixteen seeded players progressed into the last 16 of the competition. In the last 16, Alex Higgins was level at 2–2 with Cliff Thorburn, then made a total clearance of 142, the highest break of the tournament, and went on to win 5–2. In the match between Eugene Hughes and Murdo MacLeod, neither player made a break of 30 or over as Hughes won 5–2.

Kirk Stevens won his quarter-final against Dennis Taylor by winning five straight frames after trailing 0–2, and went on to beat Davis 9–7 in the semi-final to reach his first ranking tournament final. In the other semi-final, Francisco was never behind Higgins in frames, and won 9–7. With the South African Francisco and the Canadian Stevens contesting the final, it was the first snooker ranking tournament where there was no British player in the final. The next time there was a ranking final with no British players was the 2009 Grand Prix.

Francisco beat Stevens 12–9 in the final to win the title. The final was played across three sessions, with an afternoon and evening session on Saturday 2 March followed by a session on Sunday 3 March. Francisco took a 5–0 lead in the final, before Stevens won the last two frames of the first session to make it 5–2. A few frames later, he made his lead 9–4 due to another fluked pink ball. In the frame following this, Stevens compiled the highest break of the final, 108, which left Francisco 9–5 ahead at the end of the first day. The following day, Stevens took the first three frames of the third session of the final to trail by just one frame. However, Francisco won the next two frames to lead 11–8. Stevens won frame 20 from 47 points behind, but Francisco took the next to gain victory. The winner's prize money of £50,000 was a new record amount for snooker tournaments. It was Francisco's only ranking tournament win as well as Stevens' only ranking final.

Main draw
The main draw for the tournament was held with a total of 64 participants. Players listed in bold denote match winners.

Final

Qualifying
Qualifying matches were played as best-of-11-frames matches. Players in bold denote match winners.

References

British Open (snooker)
British Open
British Open
British Open
British Open